ChickFight was a women's professional wrestling promotion based in San Francisco, California.

History
ChickFight originally began as an eight-woman tournament with the first one taking place on October 29, 2004, in Hayward, California as part of All Pro Wrestling's Halloween Hell weekend. In 2006, ChickFight moved to San Francisco, California and ran regularly at the Kezar Pavilion in San Francisco's Haight Ashbury district. In 2007, the tournament was moved to England. The promotion closed in 2008.

Events

ChickFight I
Date: October 29, 2004
Location: APW Garage in Hayward, California

ChickFight II
Date: May 13, 2005 
Location: APW Garage in Hayward, California

ChickFight III
Date: October 29, 2005
Location: APW Garage in Hayward, California

ChickFight IV
Date: April 15, 2006
Location: Kezar Pavilion in San Francisco, California

ChickFight V
Date: June 24, 2006
Location: Kezar Pavilion in San Francisco, California

ChickFight VI
Date: September 1, 2006
Location: Kezar Pavilion in San Francisco, California

ChickFight VII: The UK vs The USA
Date: January 14, 2007
Location: The Marina Centre in Great Yarmouth, Norfolk

Non-Tournament Match
Destiny and Kharisma defeated The Norfolk Dolls (Britani and Melodi)

ChickFight VIII
Date: April 22, 2007
Location: Liquid Nightclub in Gloucester, Gloucestershire

Non-Tournament Matches
Cheerleader Melissa defeated "The Jezebel" Eden Black by knockout to become the first Trans-Atlantic Women's champion
Pandora defeated Bubbles
Cheerleader Melissa defeated Wesna to retain the Trans-Atlantic Women's Championship

ChickFight IX: Our Final Chance
Date: June 17, 2007
Location: Orpington Halls in Orpington, Kent

1. Kong received a bye after her scheduled opponent, Sweet Saraya, could not compete due to injury.
2. Match ended when Cheerleader Melissa attacked both wrestlers, neither advanced.

Non-Tournament Match
Wesna drew with Cheerleader Melissa (45:00), Wesna retains the RQW Women's Championship

ChickFight IX.5
Date: August 26, 2007
Location: The Suncastle in Skegness, Lincolnshire

Episode 1

The first match was declared a no contest after Cheerleader Melissa attacked both Jade and Blue Nikita.
The RQW Women's Championship match ended in disqualification when Jetta made it appear as if Eden Black had used a weapon leading to a grudge match.

Episode 2

ChickFight X
Date: May 4, 2008
Location: The Caribbean Centre in Ipswich, Suffolk

Episode 1

Episode 2

Jetta was disqualified when Wesna interfered in the match, preventing Cheerleader Melissa from applying the Kudo Driver.

ChickFight XI
Date: August 3, 2008
Location: The Caribbean Centre in Ipswich, Suffolk

Episode 1

Episode 2

ECWA Super 8 ChickFight XII Tournament

ECWA 2nd Annual Super 8 ChickFight XIII Tournament

Shimmer Women Athletes Volume 71 ChickFight XIV Tournament

Trans-Atlantic Championship

After the promotion moved to the UK whilst still retaining many North American wrestlers, the company entered into an agreement with Real Quality Wrestling and created a suitably titled Trans-Atlantic Champion to be defended. However, after nine months of inactivity the title was retired on January 22, 2008.

References

External links
ChickFight Website
Chickfight Pictures from the UK
ChickFight 7 Photos

Independent professional wrestling promotions based in California
Women's professional wrestling tournaments
Women's professional wrestling promotions